"Montserrat" is an American television play broadcast on March 2, 1971, as part of the PBS television series, Hollywood Television Theatre.

Plot
The play occurs in 1812 during Spain's occupation of Venezuela. A Spanish captain, Montserrat, concludes that the occupation is wrong and switches sides to support Simón Bolívar revolution for independence.  Monserrate is captured by the Spaniards, and Colonel Izquierdo uses cruel tactics in an effort to compel Montserrat to reveal Bolívar's location. The tactics include taking six strangers from the street and telling them that if they fail to persuade Montserrat to talk the information, they will be killed. In the second half of the play, each of the six strangers pleads his case and is executed.

Cast
 Keir Dullea as Montserrat
 Jack Albertson as Salas Ina 
 Hurd Hatfield as Salcedo
 Rip Torn as Colonel Izquierdo
 Earl Holliman as Luhan
 Geraldine Page as Felisa
 Jess Walton

Production
The production was based on Lillian Hellman's adaptation of a 1949 French play by Emmanuel Robles.

Lewis Freedman was the producer, and David Friedkin directed Montserrat.

For her work on the production, Jan Scott won the Primetime Emmy Awards for Outstanding Achievement in Art Direction or Scenic Design For a Dramatic Program or Feature Length Film, a Single Program of a Series or a Special Program. Scott's work included a massive, elegant palace set.

References

American television films
1971 television plays